Nightfall Overture is a studio album by the Swedish rock band Nightingale. The release includes eight re-recorded songs from the band's first four albums (The Breathing Shadow, The Closing Chronicles, I and Alive Again), a cover version of an Edge of Sanity song from Infernal, as well as a brand new song, "Better Safe Than Sorry". The album has collectible status due to its limited press and high demand. Swanö has stated that a reprint is unlikely because of rights management by the label.

Track listing

Credits

Band members
 Dan Swanö - vocals, guitar, keyboards
 Tom Nouga (aka Dag Swanö) - guitar, keyboards, vocals
 Erik Oskarsson - bass, vocals
 Tom Björn - drums, cymbals

Guest Musicians
 Craig Smith - lead guitar (7)

References

Nightingale (band) albums
2004 compilation albums